Hammatoderus colombiensis is a species of beetle in the family Cerambycidae. It was described by Constantino, Benavides and Esteban in 2014. It is known from Colombia.

References

Hammatoderus
Beetles described in 2014